Carl Schoenebeck (February 2, 1866 – October 9, 1940) was a member of the Wisconsin State Assembly.

Biography
Schoenebeck was born on February 2, 1866 in Germany. He moved to Oconto, Wisconsin in 1877 and Lena in 1895. In the latter part of his life, he lived in a cottage on Kelly Lake, near Suring, where he died of a heart attack on October 9, 1940.

Career
In 1900, Schoenebeck was elected to the Wisconsin Natural History Society. Schoenebeck was elected to the Wisconsin State Assembly in 1926, where he beat out W. J. Theilke by about 3,000 votes. He served on the Insurance and Banking committee while in the legislature.  Additionally, he was town chairman and a member of the village board of Lena, as well as deputy sheriff and a member of Lena's health board. He was a Republican.

References

German emigrants to the United States
People from Oconto, Wisconsin
Wisconsin city council members
Mayors of places in Wisconsin
Republican Party members of the Wisconsin State Assembly
1866 births
1940 deaths
People from Lena, Wisconsin